Holyoke Cottage may refer to:

 Holyoke Cottage (Wichita, Kansas), listed on the NRHP in Sedgwick County, Kansas
 Holyoke Cottage (Sandy Creek, New York), NRHP-listed